Timothy Josephson is a former member of the New Hampshire House of Representatives.

Education
Josephson earned a B.A. in liberal arts from Johnson State College and a master's degree in public administration from Norwich University.

Career
Josephson served as vice-chair of the Mascoma Valley Regional School District. On November 8, 2016, Josephson was elected to the New Hampshire House of Representatives where he represents the Grafton 11 district. He held office from December 7, 2016 to December 2, 2020. He is a Democrat.

Personal life
Josephson resides in Canaan, New Hampshire. Josephson is married and has two children. Josephson is an Eagle Scout.

References

Living people
Johnson State College alumni
Norwich University alumni
People from Canaan, New Hampshire
Democratic Party members of the New Hampshire House of Representatives
21st-century American politicians
Year of birth missing (living people)